Abramites eques, also known as headstander, picúo, or sardina, is a member of the family Anostomidae of the order Characiformes. This South American fish, like Abramites hypselonotus, adopts a head down swimming position due to its distinct feeding habits forced upon it by the locales it frequents.

Geographical distribution and Habitat 
This fish inhabits the Magdalena River basin in Colombia. Like its relative, Abramites hypselonotus, the picúo generally inhabits rocky, shallow, fast moving rivers and streams.

Aquarium care 
If any plants are added to the tank, the picúo will eat them. Hardy plants like Java fern should survive but no delicate species. Branches or roots should be added to the tank to provide hiding places for the fish and soft, acidic water should be provided. They can be an aggressive species so only keep with tank mates that can look after themselves.

Feeding 
A vegetable diet is best suited for the picúo. Algae wafers, pellets and high quality flake food can be given. Spinach and peas will also benefit the picúo.

Distinguishing between sexes 
Mature females tend to be plumper than the males.

References

Anostomidae
Freshwater fish of Colombia
Magdalena River
Taxa named by Franz Steindachner
Fish described in 1878